Jamua is an assembly constituency in  the Indian state of Jharkhand.

Members of Assembly 
1952: Sadanand Prasad, Indian National Congress
1967: Sadanand Prasad, Indian National Congress
1969: Sadanand Prasad, Indian National Congress
1980: Taneshwar Azad, Indian National Congress
1985: Baldeo Hazra, Communist Party of India
1990: Baldeo Hazra, Communist Party of India
1995: Sukar Rabidas, Bhartiya Janata Party
2000: Baldeo Hazra, Rashtriya Janata Dal
2005: Kedar Hazra, Bharatiya Janata Party
2009: Chandrika Mahtha, Jharkhand Vikas Morcha (Prajatantrik)
2014: Kedar Hazra, Bharatiya Janata Party
2019: Kedar Hazra, Bharatiya Janata Party

See also
Vidhan Sabha
List of states of India by type of legislature

References

Schedule – XIII of Constituencies Order, 2008 of Delimitation of Parliamentary and Assembly constituencies Order, 2008 of the Election Commission of India 

Assembly constituencies of Jharkhand